The El Vernona Hotel–John Ringling Hotel was a famous hotel located at 111 North Tamiami Trail in Sarasota, Florida, United States.

History
The hotel was designed by Dwight James Baum and built in 1926 by developer Owen Burns who named it after his wife. The hotel opened on New Year's Eve 1926. John Ringling bought it after stock market crash of 1929 and renamed it the John Ringling Hotel.  In 1964 it was renamed the John Ringling Towers and converted to apartments.  By 1980 it was vacant and deteriorating.  On March 5, 1987, it was added to the U.S. National Register of Historic Places, but the building was razed in 1998 to make room for the Sarasota Ritz-Carlton.

References

External links
El Vernona Hotel-John Ringling Hotel at Portal of Historic Resources, State of Florida

Buildings and structures in Sarasota, Florida
National Register of Historic Places in Sarasota County, Florida
Hotel buildings completed in 1925
Historic American Buildings Survey in Florida
1925 establishments in Florida
1998 disestablishments in Florida
Hotel buildings on the National Register of Historic Places in Florida
Buildings and structures demolished in 1998
Demolished hotels in Florida